The CC Clique, or Central Club Clique, was one of the political factions within the Kuomintang (The Chinese Nationalist Party), in the Republic of China (1912–49).  It was led by the brothers Chen Guofu and Chen Lifu, friends of Chiang Kai-shek.

Chen Lifu and his older brother Chen Guofu were nephews of Chen Qimei, who until his assassination by the Chinese warlord Yuan Shih-kai in 1916 was the mentor of upcoming Nationalist leader Chiang Kai-shek.  Because of those personal ties, the Chen brothers came to direct the organizational operations of the Chiang-dominated KMT, founding their own political organization known as the CC Clique.

Considered to be the extreme right of the Kuomintang alongside the Blue Shirts Society, the CC Clique represented traditionalists, anti-Communists, anti-Japanese and land interests. They stood closest to Generalissimo Chiang Kai-shek, influencing appointments and promotions, and held the largest block of votes in the Central Executive Committee. Chen Li-fu was considered the party head. Its members included many of the elite within the party, including such people as Chiang Kai-shek's wife Soong Mei-ling and H.H. Kung. They influenced intelligence, trade, banking, the military, education, and propaganda.

The CC Clique placed loyal followers throughout the party and the government machinery, ensuring influence in the bureaucracy, educational agencies, youth organization and labor unions.  The brothers also influenced the KMT's Central Bureau of Investigation and Statistics, one of Chiang's two main police and intelligence bodies. Chen Lifu freely admitted that these units caused
considerable criticism (The Storm Clouds, p. 68).

Notable members
Wang Tseng-shan, a Chinese Muslim, was the KMT commissioner of Civil Affairs in the Xinjiang Coalition Government from 1946–47, and was associated with the CC Clique. The Uyghur Masud Sabri was also a CC Clique member, as was the Tatar Burhan Shahidi and the KMT-general and Han-Chinese Wu Zhongxin.

Literature
 Frederic Wakeman: Ideological Rivalries: The Blue Shirts and the “CC” Clique, in: Frederic Wakeman (ed.): Spymaster: Dai Li and the Chinese Secret Service, Berkeley (CA): University of California Press, 2003, pp. 98–109.

References 

Kuomintang
Warlord cliques in Republican China